The 1920 Florida Gators football team represented the University of Florida during the 1920 college football season. The season was law professor William G. Kline's first of three as the head coach of the Florida Gators football team. Kline's 1920 Florida Gators compiled a marginally better 6–3 overall record than the 1919 Gators, but a lesser 1–2 conference record against Southern Intercollegiate Athletic Association (SIAA) competition.

Before the season
Kline was a former halfback for the Illinois Fighting Illini, and had previously coached the Nebraska Cornhuskers.

Schedule

Season summary

Newberry
In the season's opening week, the Gators beat , 21 to 0. The substitutes were sent in by the end.

Florida Southern

C. Anderson scored first, in the third quarter. Tully Hoyt Carlton scored the second after a series of forward passes from C. Anderson to Carlton. After the second score, Carlton failed to make the extra point for the only time all season.

Rollins
Florida defeated  by forfeit, who did not show up for the game.

Mercer
Florida easily defeated Mercer. "Carlton was the outstanding hero of the game. He ran through the entire Mercer aggregation several times for long gains and scored three of Florida's touchdowns.

Florida's starting lineup against Mercer: Swanson (left end), Baker (left tackle), Norton (left guard), Perry (center), Meisch (right guard), Vandergrift (right tackle) Driggers (right end), B. Anderson (quarterback), C. Anderson (left halfback), Carlton (right halfback), Stanley (fullback).

Tulane

Sources

The Gators were beaten 14 to 0 by  Tulane after the Gators had outplayed them for two periods. Despite the loss, Tootie Perry played one of the best games seen in Tampa.

The starting lineup was Swanson (left end), Baker (left tackle), Meisch (left guard), Wilsky (center), Perry (right guard), Vandergrif (right tackle), Briggers (right end), B. Anderson (quarterback), C. Anderson (left halfback), C. (right halfback), Merren (fullback).

Stetson
Florida beat , 26 to 0, in a game played in Palatka, Florida. The first team played lightly through the first quarter, and then substitutes were used. The field was soggy and hard to play on. The only thrill of the game came when Crom Anderson ran 90 yards for a touchdown.

Georgia

Georgia's Southern Intercollegiate Athletic Association (SIAA) champion "ten second backfield" and powerful line  rolled up a large, 56–0 score on the Gators. Florida put up a hard fight until Georgia got its first touchdown across, pouring it on from there. Georgia running back Sheldon Fitts was the star of the contest.

Wilsky and Carlton were recovering from injuries suffered in the Tulane game, and during the game Meisch and Vandegrift were carried off. Jim Merrin played best for the Gators.

Florida's starting lineup against Georgia: Swanson (left end), Baker (left tackle), Otto (left guard), Perry (center), Hodges (right guard), Vandergrift (right tackle) Coleman (right end), B. Anderson (quarterback), Pomeroy (left halfback), C. Anderson (right halfback), Merrin (fullback).

Stetson
Florida defeated the Stetson Hatters by three touchdowns using mostly straight football. "The only spectacular play of the game was when C. Anderson ran 80 yards for a touchdown, but unfortunately Florida was offside."

Florida's starting lineup against Stetson: Coleman (left end), Baker (left tackle), Meisch (left guard), Wilsky (center), Perry (right guard), Dimberline (right tackle) Hughes (right end), B. Anderson (quarterback), C. Anderson (left halfback), Carlton (right halfback), Robinson (fullback).

Oglethorpe

Sources

The Gators made thirteen first downs to Oglethorpe's three, yet lost 21 to 0. Oglethorpe made its first two touchdowns off fumbles.

Florida's starting lineup against Oglethorpe: Swanson (left end), Baker (left tackle), Perry (left guard), Wilsky (center), Norton (right guard), Hodges (right tackle) Hughes (right end), Carlton (quarterback), Pomeroy (left halfback), C. Anderson (right halfback), Robinson (fullback).

Players

Line

Backfield

References

Bibliography
 
 
 

Florida
Florida Gators football seasons
Florida Gators football